Charles I. DeBevoise (October 17, 1872 – December 10, 1958) was a United States Army officer in the early 20th century, who was awarded the Distinguished Service Medal.

Early life and education
DeBevoise was born in Brooklyn on October 17, 1872, the son of Isaac C. Debevoise and Caroline A. (Schenck) Debevoise. He attended the schools of Brooklyn and Brooklyn Polytechnic Preparatory School, then began attendance at Yale College. He graduated in 1894 and began a career as a stockbroker, first with the firm of Dudley Brothers, and later with Foster and Lounsberry.

Military career
He served in several military positions, including in the New York Army National Guard commanding the trains, as well as the commander the 107th Infantry Regiment. Between 1918 and 1919, DeBevoise commanded the 53rd Infantry Brigade of the 27th Division, and he received the Army Distinguished Service Medal. The citation for his medal reads:

He received a promotion to brigadier general after service on the Hindenburg Line.

Between 1954 and 1958, DeBevoise was a member of the National Horse Show Foundation.

Death and burial
He died on December 10, 1958. DeBevoise is buried in Section M Lot 221 of Oak Lawn Cemetery in Fairfield, Connecticut.

Family
Debevoise married Sarah Fiske Pilcher in Brooklyn on November 1, 1899. They were the parents of two daughters, Carol (b. 1901) and Martha (b. 1903). Sarah Pilcher Debevoise died on February 2, 1916. In 1926, Debevoise married Florens Hutchins (1886–1951), who had previously been married to Frederic Elliott Lewis, the owner of the ranch where the city of Diamond Bar, California is now located.

References

Bibliography

Books

Internet

External links

1872 births
1958 deaths
People from Brooklyn
United States Army generals of World War I
Recipients of the Distinguished Service Medal (US Army)
Military personnel from New York City
United States Army generals